Giacomo Perez-Dortona or d'Ortona (born 11 November 1989) is a retired French competitive swimmer belonging to club CN Marseille. At the 2012 Summer Olympics, he competed in the men's 100 metre breaststroke, finishing in 17th place in the heats, failing to reach the semifinals.  He was also part of the French men's 4 x 100 m medley relay team.

References

People from La Seyne-sur-Mer
Olympic swimmers of France
Swimmers at the 2012 Summer Olympics
French male breaststroke swimmers
Living people

1989 births
World Aquatics Championships medalists in swimming
Medalists at the FINA World Swimming Championships (25 m)
Sportspeople from Var (department)